Andrew McPherson may refer to:

 Andrew McPherson (RAF officer) (1918–1940), pilot with RAF Bomber Command in World War II
 Andrew McPherson (Australian footballer) (born 1999), Australian rules footballer
 Andrew McPherson (Scottish footballer) (1879–1944), Scottish footballer with Morton and Celtic
 Andrew McPherson, Canadian musician associated with the band Eccodek

See also
Andrew Macpherson (disambiguation)